Sabai is a state constituency in Bentong, Pahang, Malaysia. Sabai is currently represented in the Pahang State Legislative Assembly.

The state constituency is mandated to return a single member to the Pahang State Legislative Assembly under the first past the post voting system.

The current voter composition of Sabai is 37.78% Malay, 36.61% Chinese, 21.35% Indian and 3.12% Others.

Demographics

Polling districts 
According to the federal gazette issued on 31 October 2022, the Sabai constituency is divided into 8 polling districts.

History

Election results

References 

Pahang state constituencies